Farouk Kesrouani (born 8 February 1950) is a Lebanese boxer. He competed in the men's light middleweight event at the 1972 Summer Olympics.

References

1950 births
Living people
Lebanese male boxers
Olympic boxers of Lebanon
Boxers at the 1972 Summer Olympics
Place of birth missing (living people)
Light-middleweight boxers